Sylvia Ernestine Denton, CBE, FRCN began her nursing career with a qualification in general nursing from the Royal London Hospital.  She practised in the area of thoracic medicine, becoming a research sister and clinical nurse specialist.

Denton also qualified and practised as a specialist health visitor for homeless families, she also helped found the Royal College of Nursing Breast Care Nursing Society. Her master's degree is in advanced clinical practice in cancer nursing.

She was made a Fellow of the Royal College of Nursing in 1990, then in 1996 she received an OBE for services to nursing. She served on RCN Council from 1998 to 2002 as Deputy President, before being elected President of the RCN in October 2002, serving in that office until October 2006. Denton is a past president of Europa Donna UK and serves on its board. Europa Donna is a pan-European organisation which campaigns on issues for women with breast cancer.

In 2003 Denton was elected as a member of the Steering Group of the European Forum for Nursing and Midwifery Associations, and has been a member of the Department of Health's Standing Nursing and Midwifery Advisory Committee since 1998.

As of 2007 she is Lead Nurse/Senior Clinical Nurse Specialist in breast care at Barts and The London NHS Trust. Denton also chairs the editorial board of the Cancer Nursing Practice (a journal).

References

External links
Royal College of Nursing

Year of birth missing (living people)
Living people
Nurses from London
Commanders of the Order of the British Empire
Fellows of the Royal College of Nursing
Presidents of the Royal College of Nursing
British nurses